House of Councillors elections were held in Japan on 26 June 1983. The result was a victory for the ruling Liberal Democratic Party, which won 68 of the 126 seats up for election, retaining its majority in the House.

Results

By constituency

References

About Japan Series (1999), Changing Japanese Politics, No. 24, Tokyo: Foreign Press Center.
Mahendra Prakash (2004), Coalition Experience in Japanese Politics: 1993-2003, New Delhi: JNU.

Japan
House of Councillors (Japan) elections
1983 elections in Japan
June 1983 events in Asia
Election and referendum articles with incomplete results